SSE 180 Index is the stock index of Shanghai Stock Exchange, representing the top 180 companies by "float-adjusted" capitalization and other criteria. SSE 180 is a sub-index of SSE Composite Index, the latter included all shares of the exchange.

Constituents

Related indexes
Both SSE 50 Index and SSE MidCap Index were the subindex of SSE 180 Index. They did not intersect each other.

By a different selection criteria than SSE 50,  is also the sub-index of SSE 180. It consists of the top 20 companies with a cap of 6 from each kind of industries. The subindex may intersect with SSE 50 Index. SSE Mega-Cap started to publish in 2009.

References

See also
 SSE Composite Index

Shanghai Stock Exchange
Chinese stock market indices